All Souls' Day, also called The Commemoration of All the Faithful Departed, is a day of prayer and remembrance for the faithful departed, observed by certain Christian denominations on 2 November. Through prayer, intercessions, alms and visits to cemeteries, people commemorate the poor souls in purgatory and gain them indulgences.

In Western Christianity, including the Roman Catholicism and certain parts of Lutheranism and Anglicanism, All Souls' Day is the third day of Allhallowtide, after All Saints' Day (1 November) and All Hallows' Eve (October 31). Before the standardization of Western Christian observance on 2 November by St. Odilo of Cluny in the 10th century, many Catholic congregations celebrated All Souls Day on various dates during the Easter season as it is still observed in some Eastern Orthodox Church, Eastern Catholic and Eastern Lutheran churches. Churches of the East Syriac Rite (Syro-Malabar Catholic Church, Chaldean Catholic Church, Assyrian Church of the East, Ancient Church of the East) commemorate all the faithful departed on the Friday before Lent.

In other languages 
Known in Latin as Commemoratio Omnium Fidelium Defunctorum, All Souls' Day is known

 in other Germanic languages as Allerseelen (German), Allerzielen (Dutch), Alla själars dag (Swedish), and Alle Sjæles Dag (Danish);
 in the Romance languages as Dia de Finados or Dia dos Fiéis Defuntos (Portuguese), Commémoration de tous les fidèles Défunts (French), Día de los Fieles Difuntos (Spanish), Commemorazione di tutti i fedeli defunti (Italian), and Ziua morților or Luminația (Romanian);
 in the Slavic languages as Wspomnienie Wszystkich Wiernych Zmarłych (Polish), Vzpomínka na všechny věrné zesnulé, Památka zesnulých or Dušičky (Czech), Pamiatka zosnulých or Dušičky (Slovak), Spomen svih vjernih mrtvih (Croatian), and День всех усопших верных or День поминовения всех усопших(Den' vsekh usopshikh vernykh; Den' pominoveniya vsekh usopshih) (Russian)

Background

In the Catholic Church, "the faithful" refers essentially to baptized Catholics; "all souls" commemorates the church penitent of souls in purgatory, whereas "all saints" commemorates the church triumphant of saints in heaven. In the liturgical books of the Latin Church it is called the Commemoration of All the Faithful Departed.

The Catholic Church teaches that the purification of the souls in purgatory can be assisted by the actions of the faithful on earth. Its teaching is based also on the practice of prayer for the dead mentioned as far back as 2 Maccabees 12:42–46. The theological basis for the feast is the doctrine that the souls which, on departing from the body, are not perfectly cleansed from venial sins, or have not fully atoned for past transgressions, are debarred from the Beatific vision, and that the faithful on earth can help them by prayers, alms, deeds, and especially by the sacrifice of the Holy Mass.

Religious observance by denomination

Byzantine (Greek) Catholic and Eastern Orthodox

Saturday of Souls (or Soul Saturday) is a day set aside for the commemoration of the dead within the liturgical year of the Eastern Orthodox and Byzantine Catholic Churches. Saturday is a traditional day of prayer for the dead, because Christ lay dead in the Tomb on Saturday.

These days are devoted to prayer for departed relatives and others among the faithful who would not be commemorated specifically as saints. The Divine Services on these days have special hymns added to them to commemorate the departed. There is often a Panikhida (Memorial Service) either after the Divine Liturgy on Saturday morning or after Vespers on Friday evening, for which Koliva (a dish made of boiled wheatberries or rice and honey) is prepared and placed on the Panikhida table. After the Service, the priest blesses the Koliva. It is then eaten as a memorial by all present.

Radonitsa

Another Memorial Day in the East, Radonitsa, does not fall on a Saturday, but on either Monday or Tuesday of the second week after Pascha (Easter). Radonitsa does not have special hymns for the dead at the Divine Services. Instead a Panikhida will follow the Divine Liturgy, and then all will bring paschal foods to the cemeteries to greet the departed with the joy of the Resurrection.

East Syriac tradition
East Syriac churches including the Syro Malabar Church and Chaldean Catholic Church commemorates the feast of departed faithful on the last Friday of Epiphany season (which means Friday just before start of Great Lent). The season of Epiphany remembers the revelation of Christ to the world. Each Friday of Epiphany season, the church remembers important evangelistic figures.

In the Syro Malabar Church, the Friday before the parish festival is also celebrated as feast of departed faithful when the parish remembers the activities of forebearers who worked for the parish and faithful. They also request the intercession of all departed souls for the faithful celebration of parish festival. In East Syriac liturgy, the church remembers departed souls including saints on every Friday throughout the year since the Christ was crucified and died on Friday.

Western Catholicism

History
In the West there is ample evidence of the custom of praying for the dead in the inscriptions of the catacombs, with their constant prayers for the peace of the souls of the departed and in the early liturgies, which commonly contain commemorations of the dead. Tertullian, Cyprian and other early Western Fathers witness to the regular practice of praying for the dead among the early Christians.

In the sixth century, it was customary in Benedictine monasteries to hold a commemoration of the deceased members at Whitsuntide. In the time of St. Isidore of Seville (d. 636) who lived in what is today Spain, the Monday after Pentecost was designated to remember the deceased. At the beginning of the ninth century, Abbot Eigil of Fulda set 17 December as commemoration of all deceased in part of what is today Germany.

According to Widukind of Corvey (c. 975), there also existed a ceremony praying for the dead on 1 October in Saxony. But it was the day after All Saints' Day that Saint Odilo of Cluny chose when in the 11th century he instituted for all the monasteries dependent on the Abbey of Cluny an annual commemoration of all the faithful departed, to be observed with alms, prayers, and sacrifices for the relief of the suffering souls in purgatory. Odilo decreed that those requesting a Mass be offered for the departed should make an offering for the poor, thus linking almsgiving with fasting and prayer for the dead.

The 2 November date and customs spread from the Cluniac monasteries to other Benedictine monasteries and thence to the Western Church in general. The Diocese of Liège was the first diocese to adopt the practice under Bishop Notger (d. 1008). 2 November was adopted in Italy and Rome in the thirteenth century.

In the 15th century the Dominicans instituted a custom of each priest offering three Masses on the Feast of All Souls. During World War I, given the great number of war dead and the many destroyed churches where Mass could no longer be said, Pope Benedict XV, granted all priests the privilege of offering three Masses on All Souls Day.

Liturgical practice

If 2 November falls on a Sunday, All Souls' Day is observed on that day. In the Liturgy of the hours of All Souls' day the sequence Dies irae can be used ad libitum. Every priest is allowed to celebrate three holy masses on All Souls' Day.

In Divine Worship: The Missal the minor propers (Introit, Gradual, Tract, Sequence, Offertory, and Communion) are those used for Renaissance and Classical musical requiem settings, including the Dies Irae. This permits the performance of traditional requiem settings in the context of the Divine Worship Form of the Roman Rite on All Souls Day as well as at funerals, votive celebrations of all faithful departed, and anniversaries of deaths.

In the ordinary form of the Roman Rite, as well as in the Personal Ordinariates established by Benedict XVI for former Anglicans, it remains on 2 November if this date falls on a Sunday; in the 1962–1969 form of the Roman Rite, use of which is still authorized, it is transferred to Monday, 3 November.

All Souls' indulgence
According to the Enchiridion of Indulgences, an indulgence applicable only to the souls in purgatory (commonly called the poor souls) is granted to the faithful who devoutly visit on All souls Day a church or chapel and pray the Our Father and the Credo or the Lauds or Vespers of the Office of the Dead and the eternal rest prayer for the dead. The indulgence can be gained from noon of All Saints' Day on as well as a plenary indulgence is each day from the first to the eighth of November; a partial indulgence is granted on other days of the year.

Lutheran Churches

Among continental Protestants its tradition has been more tenaciously maintained. During Luther's lifetime, All Souls' Day was widely observed in Saxony although the Roman Catholic meaning of the day was discarded; ecclesiastically in the Lutheran Church, the day was merged with, and is often seen as an extension of All Saints' Day, with many Lutherans still visiting and decorating graves on all the days of Allhallowtide, including All Souls' Day. Just as it is the custom of French people, of all ranks and creeds, to decorate the graves of their dead on the jour des morts, so German, Polish and Hungarian people stream to the graveyards once a year with offerings of flowers and special grave lights. Among Czech people the custom of visiting and tidying graves of relatives on the day is quite common. In 1816, Prussia introduced a new date for the remembrance of the Dead among its Lutheran citizens: Totensonntag, the last Sunday before Advent. This custom was later also adopted by the non-Prussian Lutherans in Germany, but it has not spread much beyond the Protestant areas of Germany.

Anglican Communion

In the Church of England it is called The Commemoration of the Faithful Departed and is an optional celebration; Anglicans view All Souls' Day as an extension of the observance of All Saints' Day and it serves to "remember those who have died", in connection with the theological doctrines of the resurrection of the body and the Communion of Saints.

In the Anglican Communion, All Souls' Day is known liturgically as the Commemoration of All Faithful Departed, and is an optional observance seen as "an extension of All Saints' Day", the latter of which marks the second day of Allhallowtide. Historically and at present, several Anglican churches are dedicated to All Souls. During the English Reformation, the observance of All Souls' Day lapsed, although a new Anglican theological understanding of the day has "led to a widespread acceptance of this commemoration among Anglicans". Patricia Bays, with regard to the Anglican view of All Souls' Day, wrote that:

As such, Anglican parishes "now commemorate all the faithful departed in the context of the All Saints' Day celebration", in keeping with this fresh perspective. Contributing to the revival was the need "to help Anglicans mourn the deaths of millions of soldiers in World War I". Members of the Guild of All Souls, an Anglican devotional society founded in 1873, "are encouraged to pray for the dying and the dead, to participate in a requiem of All Souls' Day and say a Litany of the Faithful Departed at least once a month".

At the Reformation the celebration of All Souls' Day was fused with All Saints' Day in the Church of England or, in the judgement of some, it was "deservedly abrogated". It was reinstated in certain parishes in connection with the Oxford Movement of the 19th century and is acknowledged in United States Anglicanism in the Holy Women, Holy Men calendar and in the Church of England with the 1980 Alternative Service Book. It features in Common Worship as a Lesser Festival called "Commemoration of the Faithful Departed (All Souls' Day)".

Methodist Churches
In the Methodist Church, saints refer to all Christians and therefore, on All Saint's Day, the Church Universal, as well as the deceased members of a local congregation are honoured and remembered. In Methodist congregations that celebrate the liturgy on All Souls Day, the observance, as with Anglicanism and Lutheranism, is viewed as an extension of All Saints' Day and as such, Methodists "remember our loved ones who had died" in their observance of this feast.

Popular customs 
Many All Souls' Day traditions are associated with popular notions about purgatory. Bell tolling is meant to comfort those being cleansed. Lighting candles serves to kindle a light for the poor souls languishing in the darkness. Soul cakes are given to children coming to sing or pray for the dead (cf. trick-or-treating), giving rise to the traditions of "going souling" and the baking of special types of bread or cakes (cf. Pão-por-Deus).

Europe
All Souls' Day is celebrated in many European countries with vigils, candles, the decoration of graves, and special prayers as well as many regional customs. Examples of regional customs include leaving cakes for departed loved ones on the table and keeping the room warm for their comfort in Tirol and the custom in Brittany, where people flock to the cemeteries at nightfall to kneel, bareheaded, at the graves of their loved ones and anoint the hollow of the tombstone with holy water or to pour libations of milk on it. At bedtime, supper is left on the table for the souls. All Souls' Day is known in Maltese as Jum il-Mejtin, and is accompanied a traditional supper including roasted pig, based on a custom of letting a pig loose on the streets with a bell around its neck, to be fed by the entire neighborhood and cooked on that day to feed the poor. In Linz, funereal musical pieces known as aequales were played from tower tops on All Souls' Day and the evening before. In the Czech Republic and Slovakia All Souls' Day is called Dušičky, or "little souls". Traditionally, candles are left on graves on Dušičky. In Sicily and other regions of southern Italy, All Souls' Day is celebrated as the Festa dei Morti or U juornu rii morti, the "Commemoration of the Dead" or the "Day of the Dead", which according to Joshua Nicolosi of the Sicilian Post could be seen "halfway between Christian and pagan traditions". Families visit and clean grave sites, home altars are decorated with family photos and votive candles, and children are gifted a special basket or cannistru of chocolates, pomegranate, and other gifts from their ancestors. Because of the gifting of sugary sweets and the emphasis on sugar puppet decorations, the Commemoration Day has spurred local Sicilian events such as the Notte di Zucchero ("Night of Sugar") in which communities celebrate the dead.

Philippines

In the Philippines, Hallow mas is variously called "Undás", "Todos los Santos" (Spanish, "All Saints"), and sometimes "Araw ng mga Patay / Yumao" (Tagalog, "Day of the dead / those who have passed away"), which incorporates All Saints' Day and All Souls' Day. Filipinos traditionally observe this day by visiting the family dead to clean and repair their tombs. Offerings of prayers, flowers, candles, and food. Chinese Filipinos additionally burn incense and kim. Many also spend the day and ensuing night holding reunions at the cemetery with feasts and merriment.

See also
 
 Day of the Dead
 Festival of the Dead
 Zaduszki
 Flowering Sunday
 Decoration Day (Appalachia and Liberia)
 Cemetery Sunday
 Totensonntag

References

Citations

Sources

Further reading
 Tracey OSM, Liam. "The liturgy of All Souls Day", Catholic Ireland, 30 November 1999

External links

   Notes on Russian Orthodox observance by N. Bulgakov
   N. Bulgakov
 "Pope offers Mass for faithful departed on All Souls' Day", Vatican radio, 2 November 2016

Allhallowtide
Christianity and death
Eastern Orthodox liturgical days
Holidays based on the date of Easter
November observances
Observances honoring the dead